Shannon Finn (born January 25, 1972) is a Canadian former professional ice hockey player who played in the International Hockey League and American Hockey League.  He also played for the Minnesota Moose, Peoria Rivermen, Fort Wayne Komets, Utah Grizzlies, Milwaukee Admirals, Hershey Bears, Houston Aeros, and Detroit Vipers. He was drafted in the 1993 NHL Supplemental Draft by the Philadelphia Flyers.

Career statistics

External links

1972 births
Canadian ice hockey defencemen
Detroit Vipers players
Fort Wayne Komets players
Hershey Bears players
Houston Aeros (1994–2013) players
Living people
Milwaukee Admirals (IHL) players
Minnesota Moose players
National Hockey League supplemental draft picks
Peoria Rivermen (IHL) players
Philadelphia Flyers draft picks
Ice hockey people from Toronto
UIC Flames men's ice hockey players
Utah Grizzlies (IHL) players
Canadian expatriate ice hockey players in the United States